Palimar is a village in the Udupi district of Karnataka, India. It houses one of the Ashta Mathas of Udupi founded by the Dvaita philosopher Madhvacharya.

External links 
 The Eight Tulu Monasteries of Udupi by Neria Harish Hebbar, MD at Boloji.com
 Research by the Rochester Institute of Technology

Villages in Udupi district
Ashta Mathas of Udupi
Hindu monasteries in India